Etna Mountain is a summit in the U.S. state of Georgia.

Etna Mountain was named after Mount Etna, on Sicily.

References

Mountains of Polk County, Georgia
Mountains of Georgia (U.S. state)